The 1997–98 Illinois Fighting Illini men's basketball team represented the University of Illinois.

Regular season
During the 1997-98 season, head coach Lon Kruger did the unthinkable as he took a team picked to finish seventh in the Big Ten and guided the
Illini to a share of its first Big Ten title since 1984. On the way to the league crown, Illinois went 5-0 against Indiana, Iowa and Michigan, marking the first time in
school history the Illini had gone undefeated against those teams during the course of a season. Illinois advanced to the second round of the NCAA tournament after earning a No. 5 seed in the West Regional. The Illini defense was the Big Ten's best as Illinois finished the year first in scoring defense, fieldgoal defense and three-point defense in conference games.  Additionally, this would be the inaugural season for the Big Ten tournament, thus reducing the number of regular season conference games by 2, from 18 to 16.  Illinois received 2nd seed for the tournament.

Roster

Source

Schedule
												
Source																
												

|-
!colspan=12 style="background:#DF4E38; color:white;"| Non-Conference regular season

	

|-
!colspan=9 style="background:#DF4E38; color:#FFFFFF;"|Big Ten regular season

|-
!colspan=9 style="text-align: center; background:#DF4E38"|Big Ten tournament

|-			
!colspan=9 style="text-align: center; background:#DF4E38"|NCAA tournament

|-

Player stats

Awards and honors
Jerry Hester
Team Co-Most Valuable Player 
Kevin Turner
Team Co-Most Valuable Player

Team players drafted into the NBA

Rankings

References

Illinois
Illinois Fighting Illini men's basketball seasons
Illinois Fighting Illini men's basketball
Illinois Fighting Illini men's basketball
Illinois